Tamburco District is one of the nine districts of the province Abancay in Peru.

See also 
 Ampay
 Ampay National Sanctuary
 Q'illu Q'asa
 Usphaqucha
 Usnu Muqu

References

Districts of the Abancay Province
Districts of the Apurímac Region